Edmund Jan Zientara (25 January 1929 – 3 August 2010) was a Polish footballer who played as a midfielder.

Career
Born in Warsaw, Zientara played for Polonia Warsaw, Kolejarz Warszawa, CWKS Warszawa, OWKS Lublin, Gwardia Warsaw, Legia Warsaw and Maribyrnong Polonia.

He earned 36 caps for the Poland national team between 1950 and 1961. He also represented Poland at the 1960 Summer Olympics, making three appearances in the tournament.

References

1929 births
2010 deaths
Footballers from Warsaw
Polish footballers
Polonia Warsaw players
Legia Warsaw players
KS Lublinianka players
Gwardia Warsaw players
Western Eagles FC players
Pezoporikos Larnaca managers
Association football midfielders
Polish expatriate footballers
Polish expatriate sportspeople in Australia
Expatriate soccer players in Australia
Poland international footballers
Olympic footballers of Poland
Footballers at the 1960 Summer Olympics
Polish football managers
Legia Warsaw managers
Pogoń Szczecin managers
Stal Mielec managers
Wisła Kraków managers
Burials at Bródno Cemetery